JCROM is an acronym that stands for Java Content Repository (JCR) Object Mapper. It is a simple and lightweight annotation-based framework for mapping Plain Old Java Objects (POJOs) to/from nodes in a JCR. This is commonly called Object Content Mapping.

JCR specifies an API for application developers (and application frameworks) to use for interaction with modern content repositories that provide content services such as searching, versioning, transactions, etc.

There are object mapping frameworks for JDBC, like Hibernate and the Enterprise JavaBeans spec. There are also solutions for mapping to/from XML. The vision of JCROM is to provide the same for JCR.

Features
 Annotation based (needs Java 1.5)
 Lightweight, minimal external dependencies
 Works with any JCR implementation (e.g. Apache Jackrabbit, ModeShape, Adobe CQ, ...)
 DAO support
 Works with the Spring Framework and Spring Extension JCR
 Works with Google Guice

See also
Jackrabbit OCM - a framework used to persist java objects (pojos) in a JCR repository

References

External links
JSR-170: Content Repository for Java(TM) Technology API
JSR-283: Content Repository for Java(TM) Technology API, version 2.0

Jackrabbit
Java enterprise platform
Structured storage